Nimajjanam (English title: The Immersion) is a 1979 Telugu film directed by B. S. Narayana, produced by Prem Prakash, starring Sharada and Chakrapani, with cinematography by  P. S. Nivas. The film premiered at the 1980 International Film Festival of India. The film was one of the Indian entries at the Warsaw-Poland Film festival held in June 1980.

Plot
The story is about a Brahmin housewife who has to go to her in-laws house after her father-in-law dies. She and her husband take a bullock cart to immerse her father-in-law's ashes in holy water, which is the traditional Hindu custom Nimajjanam. During the journey, the cart driver starts to lust after her and eventually rapes her. Traumatized by the rape, she drowns herself in the holy water and the remorseful driver confesses his crime.

Awards
National Film Award for Best Feature Film in Telugu
Sharada won the National Film Award for Best Actress in 1979.
P. S. Nivas won Nandi Award for Best Cinematographer (1979)

References

External links

1979 films
1970s Telugu-language films
Films featuring a Best Actress National Award-winning performance
Films about rape in India
Best Telugu Feature Film National Film Award winners